Coleotechnites granti is a moth of the family Gelechiidae. It is found in North America, where it has been recorded from British Columbia.

The wingspan is 9-9.5 mm. The forewings are white sprinkled with light ochreous-tipped scales and the basal fifth of the costa is black. The hindwings are light grey.

The larvae feed on Abies grandis. They mine the leaves of their host plant. The larvae overwinters within the mine in the leaf.

References

Moths described in 1978
Coleotechnites